The ATEC 321 Faeta is a Czech ultralight and light-sport aircraft, designed and produced by ATEC v.o.s. of Libice nad Cidlinou. It was developed from the earlier ATEC 122 Zephyr 2000. The aircraft is supplied as a complete ready-to-fly-aircraft.

Design and development
The Faeta was designed to comply with the Fédération Aéronautique Internationale microlight rules and US light-sport aircraft rules. It features a cantilever low-wing, a two-seats-in-side-by-side configuration enclosed cockpit under a bubble canopy, fixed tricycle landing gear, a T-tail and a single engine in tractor configuration. It is an approved SLSA in the USA.

The aircraft fuselage is made with a carbon fibre shell and composite sandwich bulkheads. The  span wing is made from carbon fibre sandwiches built upon a laminated wooden spar. The wing varies from the Zephyr in that it has a different tapered planform and uses a new airfoil. The design attempts to provide a lower empty weight and stall speed than the 122 Zephyr. The standard engine available is the  Rotax 912ULS four-stroke powerplant.

The Nordic Omsider amphibian prototype uses the wings and part of the tail from the Faeta.

Specifications (321 Faeta)

References

External links

2000s Czech ultralight aircraft
Light-sport aircraft
Single-engined tractor aircraft
ATEC aircraft